Ekaterina Gvozdkova (born 4 August 1981) is a Russian former competitive ice dancer. She won the bronze medal at the 1995 Lysiane Lauret Challenge with Nikolai Morozov. With Timur Alaskhanov, she competed at three Grand Prix events and at the 2001 Winter Universiade. In the 2001–02 season, Gvozdkova/Alaskhanov were coached by Larisa Fedorinova in Moscow. The following season, they trained under Natalia Dubova in Stamford, Connecticut. As of January 2014, Gvozdkova was working as a skating coach in Stamford.

Programs 
(with Alaskhanov)

Competitive highlights 
GP: Grand Prix

With Alaskhanov

With Morozov

References

External links 
 

1981 births
Russian female ice dancers
Living people
Russian emigrants to the United States
Figure skaters from Moscow
Competitors at the 2001 Winter Universiade